Chondrocladia concrescens (formerly Cladorhiza concrescens),  is a carnivorous sponge in the family Cladorhizidae. It is thought that the object known as the Eltanin Antenna may be an individual of this species. Alexander Agassiz described the sponges as having "a long stem ending in ramifying roots, sunk deeply into the mud. The stem has nodes with four to six club-like appendages. They evidently cover like bushes extensive tracts of the bottom."

References

See also
Eltanin Antenna

concrescens
Sponges described in 1880